German submarine U-315 was a Type VIIC U-boat of Nazi Germany's Kriegsmarine during World War II. The submarine was laid down on 7 July 1942 at the Flender Werke yard at Lübeck as yard number 315, launched on 29 May 1943 and commissioned on 10 July under the command of Oberleutnant zur See Herbert Zoller.

During her career, the U-boat sailed on 11 combat patrols, sinking one ship and causing another to be declared a total loss, before she surrendered on 9 May 1945.

She was a member of thirteen wolfpacks.

Design
German Type VIIC submarines were preceded by the shorter Type VIIB submarines. U-315 had a displacement of  when at the surface and  while submerged. She had two shafts and two  propellers.

U-315 was fitted with five  torpedo tubes (four fitted at the bow and one at the stern), fourteen torpedoes, one  SK C/35 naval gun, 220 rounds, and two twin  C/30 anti-aircraft guns. The boat had a complement of between forty-four and sixty.

Service history
The boat's service life began with training with the 8th U-boat Flotilla from 10 July 1943. She was then transferred to the 11th flotilla for operations on 1 March 1944. She was reassigned to the 13th flotilla on 15 September 1944.

The boat made the short journey from Kiel in Germany to Bergen in Norway, in February 1944.

First patrol
The submarine's first patrol began with her departure from Bergen on 21 February 1944. After covering the Norwegian and Barents seas, she docked at Narvik on 9 March.

Second to sixth patrols
A similar pattern now became apparent, except her sixth sortie took the U-boat to the entrance to Murmansk in the Soviet Union.

Seventh, eighth and ninth patrols
U-315s seventh foray was, at five days, her shortest; starting in Bogenbucht (west of Narvik), on 29 September 1944 and finishing in Hammerfest on 3 October.

Her eighth patrol was fairly routine, after which she moved from Kilbotn to Skjomenfjord in November 1944.

The boat's ninth patrol was much the same as her eighth, passing north of Bear Island between 29 and 30 November 1944.

Tenth patrol
Patrol number 10 took the submarine to the gap between the Faroe and Shetland Islands.

Eleventh patrol
What turned out to be U-315s last patrol was her longest (69 days) and most successful. On 22 March 1945, she sank the Empire Kingsley northwest of Lands End. In the same area, she torpedoed  on 29 March. The Canadian frigate lost  of her stern and although she did not sink, was declared a total loss.

Fate
The boat surrendered in Trondheim at war's end. There, she was broken up in March 1947.

Summary of raiding history

References

Notes

Citations

Bibliography

External links

German Type VIIC submarines
U-boats commissioned in 1943
World War II submarines of Germany
1943 ships
Ships built in Lübeck